The 2013 Kazan Summer Cup was a professional tennis tournament played on outdoor hard courts. It was the first edition of the tournament which was part of the 2013 ATP Challenger Tour and 2013 ITF Women's Circuit, offering a total of $100,000 in prize money. It took place in Kazan, Russia, on 10–18 August 2013.

Men's singles entrants

Seeds 

 1 Rankings as of 5 August 2013

Other entrants 
The following players received wildcards into the singles main draw:
  Aydin Akhmetshin
  Evgeny Karlovskiy
  Timur Kiuamov
  Vladimir Polyakov

The following players received entry from the qualifying draw:
  Mikhail Elgin
  Evgeny Elistratov
  Sergey Strelkov
  Mikhail Vaks

The following players received entry as lucky losers:
  Mikhail Fufygin
  Denis Matsukevich

Women's singles entrants

Seeds 

 1 Rankings as of 5 August 2013

Other entrants 
The following players received wildcards into the singles main draw:
  Aida Kalimullina
  Veronika Kudermetova
  Evgeniya Rodina
  Ekaterina Yashina

The following players received entry from the qualifying draw:
  Alexandra Artamonova
  Martina Borecká
  Marina Shamayko
  Anna Shkudun

The following player received entry into the singles main draw as a lucky loser:
  Alison Bai

Champions

Men's singles 

  Sergiy Stakhovsky def.  Valery Rudnev 6–2, 6–3

Women's singles 

  Lyudmyla Kichenok def.  Valentyna Ivakhnenko 6–2, 2–6, 6–2

Men's doubles 

  Victor Baluda /  Konstantin Kravchuk def.  Ivo Klec /  Jürgen Zopp 6–3, 6–4

Women's doubles 

  Veronika Kudermetova /  Evgeniya Rodina def.  Alexandra Artamonova /  Martina Borecká 5–7, 6–0, [10–8]

References

External links 
  
 2013 Kazan Summer Cup at ITFtennis.com

2013 ATP Challenger Tour
2013 ITF Women's Circuit
2013
2013 in Russian tennis
21st century in Kazan